The Serbian women's national under-18 and under-19 basketball team represents Serbia in international basketball matches and is controlled by the Basketball Federation of Serbia, the governing body for basketball in Serbia.

Olympic Committee of Serbia declared women's national under-18 and under-19 basketball  team for the best female team of the year 2005.

FIBA U18 Women's European Championship

FIBA Under-19 Women's Basketball World Cup

Current roster
2012 FIBA Europe Under-18 Championship for Women

Coach: Zoran Kovačić

Previous squads

European Championship Under-18
 2005 European Championship — 1st place
Maja Milutinović, Tamara Radočaj, Iva Prčić, Maja Miljković, Adrijana Knežević, Dunja Prčić, Sonja Petrović, Biljana Stjepanović, Jelena Cerina, Vanja Ilić, Zorica Mitov, Miljana Bojović. Head Coach: Željko Vukićević
 2006 European Championship — 2nd place
Ana Dabović, Sonja Petrović, Snežana Aleksić, Iva Roglić, Nina Bogićević, Jelena Milovanović, Maja Miljković, Dragana Gobeljić, Jelena Cerina, Smiljana Ivanović, Ivana Musović, Anđa Ivković. Head Coach: Željko Vukićević
 2007 European Championship — 1st place
Jovana Popović, Sonja Petrović, Nevena Jovanović, Tatjana Živanović, Nina Bogićević, Jelena Milovanović, Jelena Jovanović, Jelena Mitić, Milica Paligorić, Sara Krnjić, Ivana Musović, Mina Jovanović. Head Coach: Zoran Kovačić
 2012 European Championship — 3rd place
Ivana Bošković, Una Nikolić, Jovana Vidaković, Nataša Kovačević, Olga Stepanović, Kristina Topuzović, Aleksandra Stanaćev, Katarina Vučković, Žaklina Jaković, Sanja Mandić, Dragana Stanković, Aleksandra Crvendakić. Head Coach: Zoran Kovačić
 2013 European Championship — 3rd place
Ines Ćorda, Bojana Stevanović, Bogdana Rodić, Danica Piper, Branka Luković, Anja Spasojević, Sanja Mandić, Aleksandra Crvendakić, Radmila Maletić, Julijana Vojinović, Dragana Stanković, Jelena Ćirić. Head Coach: Zoran Kovačić
 2017 European Championship — 2nd place
Nevena Dimitrijević, Ivana Curaković, Ivana Katanić, Marijana Zukanović, Teodora Turudić, Lena Radulović, Marta Vulović, Nevena Naumčev, Mina Đorđević, Jelena Novković, Ana Perić, Ivana Raca. Head Coach: Miloš Pavlović

World Championship Under-19
 2005 World Championship — 2nd place
Tamara Radočaj, Dajana Butulija, Jelena Cerina, Iva Prčić, Maja Miljković, Zorica Mitov, Adrijana Knežević, Jelena Dubljević, Dunja Prčić, Vanja Ilić, Biljana Stjepanović, Miljana Bojović. Head Coach: Željko Vukićević
 2007 World Championship — 3rd place
Jovana Mesaroš, Sonja Petrović, Irena Matović, Nina Bogićević, Iva Roglić, Jelena Milovanović, Maja Miljković, Dragana Gobeljić, Jelena Cerina, Smiljana Ivanović, Ivana Musović, Anđa Ivković. Head Coach: Zoran Kovačić

References

External links
 Basketball Federation of Serbia

U18
Women's national under-18 basketball teams
Women's national under-19 basketball teams